Paul Bassett is a brand name of coffeehouses that operates in Japan and South Korea, named after World Barista Championship winning Australian barista Paul Bassett. The businesses in both countries share the same logo.

Operations

Japan
As of 2017, there are two stores in Japan: one in Shinjuku, and the other in Shibuya.

South Korea
The first Paul Bassett branded coffeehouse in South Korea opened in 2009.

As of 2017, the chain celebrated the opening of its 80th coffee franchise in South Korea with most stores located in the Seoul Capital Area.

See also
 List of coffeehouse chains

References

External links
  of Paul Bassett stores in Japan 
  of Paul Bassett chain in South Korea 

Coffeehouses and cafés in South Korea
Coffeehouses and cafés in Japan
Coffeehouses and cafés in Australia
2006 establishments in Japan
Coffee brands